Esselen was the language of the Esselen (or self-designated Huelel) Nation, which aboriginally occupied the mountainous Central Coast of California, immediately south of Monterey (Shaul 1995). It was probably a language isolate, though has been included as a part of the hypothetical Hokan proposal.

Names

The name Esselen was derived from a village name. The Esselen people referred to their own language as Huelel. The name was recorded by Felipe Arroyo de la Cuesta on May 18, 1832 at Soledad Mission from his informant Eusebio (native name Sutasis) (cf. villel 'tongue' as recorded by Dionisio Alcalá Galiano) (Shaul 1995).

Historical background
French explorer Jean La Perouse, who visited Monterey in 1786, reported:

Esselen may have been the first Californian language to become extinct. Although it was spoken by many of the early converts at Mission Carmel, its use rapidly declined during the Hispanic period. Very little information on the vocabulary and grammar of Esselen was preserved. About 350 words and phrases and a few complete sentences have been preserved in literature, including a short bilingual catechism (for a summary see Mithun 1999:411–413 and Golla 2011:114). By the beginning of the 20th century the only data on Esselen that investigators such as Kroeber and Harrington could collect were a few words remembered by speakers of other Indian languages in the area.

Classification
H. W. Henshaw thought that Esselen represented a monotypic linguistic family. Others, such as Shaul (2019), have assigned the language to the proposed Hokan family. While it is likely that much of Dixon & Kroeber's Hokan-Penutian model will stand the test of time, the subject matter is both complex and poorly understood, and is thus subject to revision.

Shaul (2019) also notes that Esselen has had extensive contact with the Chumashan languages, with Esselen and Chumashan sharing many common lexical items.

Dialects
The Esselen language consisted of the Western and Eastern dialects. Documentation of Western Esselen was based on data collected at Mission Carmel. It was spoken by the Excelen local tribe, and likely also the Ecgeajan local tribes to the south along the Big Sur coast, although the Ecgeajan subdialect is unattested. Eastern Esselen was documented by Arroyo, and was based on data collected at Mission Soledad, which hosted Arroyo Seco local tribes. Eastern Esselen was spoken by the Eslenajan local tribe, and probably also by the Aspasniajan and Imunajan local tribes.

The Esselen language was spoken by five local tribes. Each of the five local tribes spoke a separate subdialect.

Western
Excelen: upper Carmel Valley
Ecgeajan: along the Big Sur coast
Eastern
Imunajan: along the Arroyo Seco, just south of Mission Soledad
Eslenajan (or Eslen): north of Mission Soledad
Aspasniajan: just south of the present day town of Greenfield

The Santa Lucia Mountains formed the heart of the Esselen homeland.

Each Esselen district consisted of a local tribe with their own patrilineal clans. Members of the clans were exogamous, marrying members of other clans but within the local tribe.

Local Esselen tribes and their demographics are surveyed in Milliken (1990: 59).

Breschini and Haversat (1994: 82-88) give the following numbers of villages and population estimates for each of the five Esselen tribes. Population estimates are calculated by multiplying the number of villages by either 30 or 40 (i.e., the presumed number of individuals per village).

Phonological and lexical differences
Sound correspondences between the Western and Eastern dialects:

Lexical differences between the Western and Eastern dialects:

Phonology

Pronouns
Subject pronouns in Western Esselen (Shaul 2019: 89):

{| class="wikitable"
!  !! sg !! pl
|-
! 1
| ene ~ eni || leč-s; lex
|-
! 2
| nemi ~ nimi || nemič; nemux
|-
! 3
| lal || lač; lax
|}

Subject pronouns in Eastern Esselen (Shaul 2019: 89):

{| class="wikitable"
!  !! sg !! pl
|-
! 1
| ene ~ ne || leṭ; lex
|-
! 2
| name || nomeṭ; nomux
|-
! 3
| huiniki || laṭ; lax
|}

Syntax
Word order is primarily SOV (Shaul 2019).

Lexicon
Shaul (1995) reconstitutes Esselen vocabulary, synthesized from various historical sources, as follows. Forms from Alfred L. Kroeber are marked by (Kr).

Numbers

References

Bibliography 
 Golla, Victor. 2011. California Indian Languages. University of California Press.
 Mithun, Marianne. 1999. The Languages of Native North America. Cambridge University Press.
 Shaul, David L. 1995. "The Huelel (Esselen) Language." International Journal of American Linguistics 61:191-239.

External links

 Esselen language overview at the Survey of California and Other Indian Languages
 Spanish-Rumsen-Esselen Glossary, 1802
 Salinan-Esselen vocabulary, p. 73
 Esselen at the California Language Archive
 OLAC resources in and about the Esselen language
 Esselen, The World Atlas of Language Structures

Indigenous languages of California
Language isolates of North America
Extinct languages of North America
Hokan languages
Languages extinct in the 19th century
19th-century disestablishments in California